Sheppard Cottage is a historic house in Eufaula, Alabama, U.S.. It was built for Henry H. Field in 1837. It was later purchased by Mariah A. Snipes, who lived in the house until she deeded it to John DeWitt Snipes in 1858. In 1868, it was acquired Dr. Edmund Sheppard, a physician and a veteran of the Confederate States Army during the American Civil War of 1861–1865. It was later purchased by C. L. Lunsford, who eventually gave it to the Eufaula Heritage Association. It has been listed on the National Register of Historic Places since May 27, 1971.

References

Houses on the National Register of Historic Places in Alabama
Houses completed in 1837
Houses in Barbour County, Alabama